Dali railway station is a railway station of Datong–Xi'an high-speed railway located in Dali County, Weinan, Shaanxi, China. The station started operation on 1 July 2014, together with the railway. The old Dali railway station on Xi'an–Hancheng railway was then renamed to Dali North railway station.

References

Railway stations in China opened in 2014
Railway stations in Weinan